The Battle of Shiromoni (Bengali:  শিরোমণির যুদ্ধ) (13–17 December 1971) was fought during the Bangladesh Liberation War and the Indo-Pakistani War of 1971 between the Pakistan Army and the joint forces of the Bangladesh and Indian Army. This was one of the last battles of the Bangladesh Liberation War which continued till 17 December 1971, even though the commander of all Pakistani Forces in Bangladesh had already surrendered on 16 December 1971.

Background
On 31st March 1971 i.e. five days after Bangladesh declared independence from Pakistan and waged war against the Pakistani military, members of the East Pakistan Rifles and other Bengali armed forces (who now formed the Mukti Bahini of Bangladesh) from Khulna, Satkira and Jessore were able to liberate the city of Jessore from the occupying Pakistani military. Even though the city was liberated, one of the main power bases of the Pakistan military was in the nearby Jessore cantonment. During the Second World War when the Japanese were able to occupy the Burma region of the then British India (which also included present-day Pakistan and Bangladesh), the British government established the Jessore cantonment to create a strong defense against any potential Japanese attack. As such, even after the British left and East Bengal became a region of Pakistan, the Jessore cantonment remained a powerful military base for the Pakistanis. Thus the Pakistanis were able to re-empower themselves on 3rd April and by 6th April the Pakistani military retook the Jessore city. In order to liberate the city again, the Bangladeshi forces had to wait for nine-months during the war, when on 6th December the Bangladeshi forces along with their Indian allies retook the city from Pakistani army. The next day, i.e. 7th December, the allied Bangladeshi and Indian forces prepared themselves to take the Jessore cantonment which was full of Pakistani tanks and armoury. Sensing the approach of the enemy, the Pakistani forces left the cantonment with all their arsenals and tanks and moved almost fifty-four kilometers towards Shiromoni of the Khulna Division.

Even though the Jessore city was lost, the Pakistanis were able to develop a strong resistance against the Bangladeshi and Indian forces at Shiromoni. Commanding the Pakistani forces at Shiromoni was Brigadier Hayat Khan of the 107th Infantry Brigade. According to the book ‘The Tank Battle of Shiromoni’ by Gazi Saiful Hasan, there were three main reasons why the Pakistanis positioned themselves at Shiromoni:

•	Since the emergence of Pakistan, Shiromoni was the spot of Pakistani military training and so the Pakistan army knew this area well.

•	Shiromoni was located near the BSCIC Industrial Estate by the Bhairab River which provided a strong geographical defense for the military.

•	Lastly, Brigadier Hayat Khan thought the U.S. 7th Fleet would come for their aid through the Bay of Bengal and join the Pakistani forces through the Bhairab river.

Whatever was their reason, the Pakistanis prepared themselves from 7th to 12th December to fight their enemies. The Pakistanis had thirty-two tanks, besides these the Pakistani soldiers stationed themselves on every building of Shiromoni and established their headquarters at the Shiromoni Cable Factory (now known as Bangladesh Cable Shilpa Limited). Apart from these, from the cable factory to Daulatpur the Pakistanis set up huge number of bunkers and landmines which established a strong defensive position for them.

On the other hand, after finding the Jessore cantonment completely empty of enemy troops on 7th December, the Bangladeshi and Indian forces got to know that the Pakistanis have taken position at Shiromoni. After this, Sector VIII of Mukti Bahini under the command of Major Muhammed Abul Manzur began to march towards Khulna and on 11th December took position at Fultola near Shiromoni to prepare for an offensive against the Pakistani forces. Right after this, Indian forces under the command of Major Gani and Major Mahendra Singh led the Indian Rajput Regiment with large number of tanks to enter Bangladesh through Benapole. Through Kalaroa Sub-district, the Indian forces joined Major Manzur's forces at Fultola. Also, members of Sector IX of the Mukti Bahini under the command of Major Joynal Abedin took positions at Gollamri More of Khulna and Khulna Shipyard, south of Shiromoni. By this time, since Khulna, Jessore, Faridpur and Kushtia had been liberated from Pakistani forces, Mukti Bahini from all these areas began to surround Shiromoni from all directions.

The Battle

Ambush at Badamtola
The Battle of Shiromoni officially started on 13th December. The Mukti Bahini under the command of Major Manzur started to fire heavily with machine guns at Pakistani soldiers stationed at Shiromoni. Simultaneously, the Indian forces established communication with Kolkata to launch air strikes at Shiromoni. The Pakistanis also retaliated with heavy fire through their tanks and ammunitions but suffered immense losses. The next day, seeing no signs of aggression from the Pakistanis, Major Mahendra Singh of the Indian Army thought the Pakistanis might have left Shiromoni and retreated south towards Khulna. For this reason, they were contemplating to move towards Khulna to chase the enemy. Even though Major Manzur asked the Indians to maintain caution, the Indian army under the command of Major Mahendra Singh and Major Gani took 28 vehicles and started to move towards Khulna. On their way to Khulna, after passing through Shiromoni and getting near Badamtola, the Indians faced an ambush by the Pakistani military. Among the 28 vehicles, 26 vehicles got destroyed by the Pakistani Army. In the midst of this ambush, Major Gani was killed but Major Mahendra Singh was able to flee back towards Major Manzur's position at Fultola. Around 250 Indian soldiers got killed or injured at Badamtola.

The battle continues even after 16th December
Due to the strong defensive position of the Pakistan Army, the Mukti Bahini and the Indians were unable to make the Pakistanis retreat. Thus, with moments of brief ceasefires, the battle continued for days till 17th December, even though the commander of all Pakistani forces in Bangladesh, Lieutenant General Amir Abdullah Khan Niazi surrendered to joint Indian and Bangladeshi forces at Dhaka on 16th December (which officially ended the Bangladesh Liberation War and Indo-Pakistani War of 1971). Even though the Instrument of Surrender signed by Lt. General Niazi clearly stated that, “The PAKISTAN Eastern Command agree to surrender all PAKISTAN Armed Forces in BANGLA DESH to Lieutenant-General JAGJIT SINGH AURORA, General Officer Commanding in Chief of Indian and BANGLA DESH forces in the Eastern Theatre. This surrender includes all PAKISTAN land, air and naval forces as also all para-military forces and civil armed forces. These forces will lay down their arms and surrender at the places where they are currently located to the nearest regular troops under the command of Lieutenant-General JAGJIT SINGH AURORA”, Brigadier Hayat Khan of the Pakistan Army stationed at Shiromoni, however, still had not surrendered and intended to carry on the battle.

Major Manzur takes command of the joint Bangladeshi and Indian Forces at Shiromoni
On 17th December at 3:00 am, the Bangladeshi and Indian forces faced heavy casualties: among the Indians, seven soldiers died and thirty men got injured; among the Bangladeshis, thirty-one soldiers died and more than 120 men were injured. At 3:10 am, Major Mahendra Singh again requested Kolkata for launching air strikes at Shiromoni, however, they were told that air strike was impossible until sunup. Due to continuous casualties, taking a jeep with him, Major Manzur decided to go to Jessore Cantonment and re-evaluate their battle plans. After a military meeting of ten minutes, it was decided that Major Manzur will be in command of the joint Bangladeshi and Indian forces at Shiromoni and Fultola. As soon as he took responsibility of his new command, Major Manzur sent a wireless message to the Sector IX Commander, Major Joynal Abedin, whose forces were still stationed south of Shiromoni at Khulna region. On receiving Major Manzur's message, Major Joynal Abedin with the aid of Sector IX Mukti Bahini and fighters from Satkhira and other regions of Khulna began to attack the Pakistani defense positions at southern Shiromoni and started to slowly move towards the Shiromoni region. By this time, in the north, Major Manzur moved back near Shiromoni and took charge of his new command and set new battle tactics for the mission. Major Manzur decided that they were no longer going to wait for the Indian airstrikes at dawn and face more casualties. Instead they were going to face the enemy head-on. Firstly, he brought the Mukti Bahini fighters stationed at the right of Shiromoni to the second line of defence in the front line and sent the Indian soldiers at the front line to the right of Shiromoni. Two commandos on the left side and three commandos on the back side were put on the front line defense, while the other Indian soldiers were posted at the back side of the defense. Manzur then ordered two Indian tanks to move towards Shiromoni using the main road and ordered an additional six tanks to attack the Pakistani strong positions from the right side. Behind each of these tanks Major Manzur sent twelve Mukti Bahini men eager to get martyred. With them joined Major Manzur himself.

With 25 or more Pakistani tanks in front of them Major Manzur and his suicidal commando force began to advance towards the enemy tanks amidst heavy fire from tanks and hundreds of mortars. They breached the Pakistani lines and began to destroy tanks and cannons. They began to throw grenades inside any Pakistani tanks which had their hatches open. This helped decline the Pakistani soldiers’ morale and many of them began to abandon their tanks and desert their positions.  

On the other side, the Indian forces at the back still had no clue whether Major Manzur was still alive or not. Around this time, message from the front line reached the Indian soldiers that Major Manzur was still alive and the Pakistanis were slowly retreating. By six o’clock it was already sunup and as planned the Indian airstrikes finally arrived to lay the final nail in the coffin of the Pakistani frontline defense. With 157 of his men killed, Brigadier Hayat Khan agreed to surrender to Major Manzur.

Surrender of Brigadier Hayat Khan
On that day, at around 1:30 pm, Brigadier Hayat Khan, along with his 3,700 men, officially surrendered to joint Bangladeshi and Indian Forces on the premises of Khulna Circuit House, fifteen kilometers away from Shiromoni. Brigadier Delvar Singh of the Indian Army, who arrived at the surrender ceremony via helicopter, signed the document for the Pakistani surrender on behalf of the allied forces. The instrument of surrender was signed at 1:55 pm.

References

History of India
Shiromoni
Shiromoni
Shiromoni